The Oryol Prison has been a prison in Oryol since the 19th century. It was a notable place of incarceration for political prisoners and war prisoners of the Second World War.

The building of prison, built in 1840, is one of the oldest buildings in the city of Oryol.

In 1941, the Oryol isolation prison contained some five thousand political prisoners. On 11 September 1941, just weeks before the occupation by German troops, by personal order of Joseph Stalin, 157 political prisoners incarcerated here were executed just outside Oryol, in the Medvedev Forest massacre. During the occupation by the Nazi Germany (since October 1941 to June 1943) here was established a concentration camp.

After the Second World War, the Soviet authorities used it as a concentration camp for prisoners of war, among them being Dietrich von Saucken. Prisoners of war (from Germany, Hungary, Romania) were exterminated by starvation, shooting, exposure, and poisoning. A former prisoner, Latkovska-Wojtuskiewicz, described the scene at Easter in 1951 as "a veritable hell: the room was full of people, half-naked women languished and we, the new arrivals, wallowed on filthy straw, from which rose a stinking dust which choked one's breath. We were so hoarse we could neither breathe nor speak."

At present, in the buildings of the former prison there is an investigatory isolation ward No. 1 of the Penitentiary Service under the Ministry of Justice of the Russian Federation and a prison hospital for tuberculosis patients.

Notable inmates

 Aleksander Prystor (1914-1917)
 Felix Dzerzhinsky (1915–16) 
 Olga Kameneva 
 Michael Kitzelmann
 Grigory Kotovsky (1910) 
 Jan Kwapiński
 AA Litkens (1908–09)
 GI Matiashvili (1915–16)
 Christian Rakovsky
 Maria Spiridonova 
 Dietrich von Saucken 
 Varvara Yakovleva 
 BP Zhadanovsky (1912–14) 
 Aron Baron (1921)

References
 Dennis Christensen 2017–present
https://www.jw-russia.org/en/infographic/506.html

Bibliography 
 
 Гернет М. Н., История царской тюрьмы, 3 изд., т. 15, М., 1960-63 г.
 Дворянов В. Н., В сибирской дальней стороне (Очерки истории царской каторги и ссылки, 60-е годы XVIII в. — 1917 г.), Минск, 1971 г.
 Максимов С. В., Сибирь и каторга, 2 изд., ч. 1-3, СПБ, 1891 г.

Prisons in the Soviet Union
Camps of the Gulag
Nazi concentration camps
History of Oryol
Prisons in Russia
Tourist attractions in Oryol Oblast
Government buildings completed in 1840
Infrastructure completed in 1840
Buildings and structures in Oryol Oblast
Objects of cultural heritage of Russia of regional significance
Cultural heritage monuments in Oryol Oblast